Prascorsano is a comune (municipality) in the Metropolitan City of Turin in the Italian region Piedmont, located about  north of Turin. 

Prascorsano borders the following municipalities: Cuorgnè, San Colombano Belmonte, Canischio, Pratiglione, Valperga, Pertusio, and Rivara. Nearby sights include the Sacro Monte di Belmonte.

References

Cities and towns in Piedmont